Roman Alekseyevich Stefanov (born 9 March 1978) is a former Russian professional footballer.

External links
 
 

1978 births
Living people
Russian footballers
Association football defenders
FC Dynamo Stavropol players
FC Naftan Novopolotsk players
FC Darida Minsk Raion players
FC Vitebsk players
FC Baikal Irkutsk players
FC Dynamo Bryansk players
FC Kristall Smolensk players
Belarusian Premier League players
Russian expatriate footballers
Expatriate footballers in Belarus